Belica is a small settlement in the Municipality of Osilnica in southern Slovenia. The area is part of the traditional region of Lower Carniola and is now included in the Southeast Slovenia Statistical Region.

Name
Belica was attested in historical documents as Weissembach and Weissennbach in 1498.

Cultural heritage
There is a small chapel-shrine in the settlement dedicated to the Virgin Mary. It dates to the second half of the 19th century.

References

External links
Belica on Geopedia

Populated places in the Municipality of Osilnica